Michael R. Munley (born December 27, 1998) is an American professional racing driver. He last competed part-time in the NASCAR Xfinity Series driving the No. 6 Chevrolet Camaro for JD Motorsports.

Racing career
On August 5, 2021, it was announced that Munley would make his debut in the NASCAR Xfinity Series in the race at Watkins Glen International. He would drive the JD Motorsports No. 6 car. Munley started the race in 34th, finishing in 35th due to a suspension issue.

Motorsports career results

NASCAR
(key) (Bold – Pole position awarded by qualifying time. Italics – Pole position earned by points standings or practice time. * – Most laps led.)

Xfinity Series

 Season still in progress
 Ineligible for series points

References

External links
 

Living people
1998 births
NASCAR drivers
Racing drivers from Virginia